Amandla (a word in several Nguni languages, including Zulu and Xhosa, meaning "power") is an album by jazz musician Miles Davis, released in 1989. It is the third collaboration between Miles Davis and producer/bassist Marcus Miller, after Tutu (1986) and Music from Siesta (1987), and their final album together. The album mixes elements of the genres go-go, zouk, funk and jazz, combining electronic instruments with live musicians. The composition "Mr. Pastorius", featuring drummer Al Foster, is a tribute to late jazz bassist Jaco Pastorius. "Catémbe" is a Mozambican and Angolan cocktail of red wine and cola.

Critical reception 
In a contemporary review, DownBeat said Amandla possessed "a precise and consistent sound that flows through the shifting instrumental combinations and lingers after the music has stopped". In The Rolling Stone Album Guide (2004), J. D. Considine felt the record sounded "vaguely African" and somewhat conservative because of its reliance on session musicians.

Track listing

Personnel 
 Miles Davis – trumpet
 Marcus Miller – arrangements (1, 3-8), keyboards (1, 3-6, 8), guitars (1, 4, 7), bass, drums (1), bass clarinet (1-4, 7, 8), soprano saxophone (1, 3), additional keyboards (2, 7)
 George Duke – keyboards (2), Synclavier (2), arrangements (2)
 Joey DeFrancesco – additional keyboards (2)
 Joe Sample – acoustic piano (6)
 John Bigham – keyboards (7), guitars (7), drum programming (7), arrangements (7)
 Jason Miles – synthesizer programming (8)
 Michael Landau – guitars (2)
 Foley – guitars (3, 4, 7)
 Jean-Paul Bourelly – guitars (3, 5)
 Billy "Spaceman" Patterson – wah-wah guitar (7)
 Ricky Wellman – drums (3, 7)
 Omar Hakim – drums (4, 6)
 Al Foster – drums (8)
 Don Alias – percussion (1, 3, 6)
 Mino Cinelu – percussion (1)
 Paulinho da Costa – percussion (4, 5)
 Bashiri Johnson – percussion (6)
 Kenny Garrett – alto saxophone (1, 3-7), soprano saxophone (2)
 Rick Margitza – tenor saxophone (5)

Production 
 Miles Davis – executive producer, cover artwork 
 Tommy LiPuma – producer (1, 3-8)
 Marcus Miller – producer (1, 3-8)
 George Duke – producer (2)
 John Bigham – associate producer (7)
 Eric Calvi – recording (1, 3-8)
 Bruce Miller – recording (1, 3-8)
 Erik Zobler – recording (2)
 Al Schmitt – additional recording 
 Henry Falco – additional engineer 
 Alec Head – additional engineer 
 Debi Cornish – assistant engineer 
 Kevin Fisher – assistant engineer 
 Mitch Gibson – assistant engineer 
 Roy Hendrickson – assistant engineer 
 Ed Korengo – assistant engineer 
 Scott Mabuchi – assistant engineer 
 Joe Martin – assistant engineer 
 Danny Mormando – assistant engineer 
 Dave Wolk – assistant engineer 
 Bill Schnee – mixing 
 Doug Sax – mastering 
 Bibi Green – production coordinator
 Rosemary Kraitz – production coordinator
 Stephanie McCravey – production coordinator
 Jo Gelbard – cover artwork 
 Richard Rothman – photography 

Studios
 Recorded at Clinton Recording Studios, Electric Lady Studios, The Power Station, Right Track Recording and Quadrasonic Studio (New York City, New York); Le Gonks West (West Hollywood, California); Ocean Way Recording (Hollywood, California).
 Mixed at Bill Schnee Studios (North Hollywood, California).
 Mastered at The Mastering Lab (Hollywood, California).

References 

 Bibliography
 Cole, George (March 16, 2005) The Last Miles: The Music of Miles Davis, 1980–1991. University of Michigan Press.

External links 
 

Miles Davis albums
1989 albums
Warner Records albums
Albums produced by Tommy LiPuma
Albums produced by Marcus Miller